Erstfeld railway station is a railway station in the Swiss canton of Uri and municipality of Erstfeld. The station is situated on the original line of the Gotthard railway, at the foot of the ramp up to the Gotthard Tunnel. Most trains on the Gotthard route now use the base tunnel and therefore do not pass through the station.

A motive power depot at Erstfeld station houses rolling stock needed for the Gotthard route, and especially for banking service. A Ce 6/8 "crocodile" serves as a memorial for the legendary Gotthard locomotives.

Services
 the following services stop at Erstfeld:

References

External links
 
 

Railway stations in the canton of Uri
Swiss Federal Railways stations